Kupper or Kuppers (also Küpper)  is a surname of Germanic origin meaning maker or repairer of wooden vessels. It is related to the English surname Cooper.

People
Alex Kupper (born 1990), American football player
András Kupper (born 1964), Hungarian physician and politician
Annelies Kupper (1906-1987), German operatic soprano
Anneliese Küppers (1929–2010), German equestrian and Olympic medalist
Eduardo Ferreyros Kuppers, Peruvian politician and Minister of Foreign Commerce and Tourism
Eileen Küpper, South African singer
Eric Kupper, American remixer
Hans Küppers (born 1938), German footballer
Jochen Küpper (born 1971), German physicist and chemist
Josef Kupper (1932-2017), Swiss chess master
Ketti Kupper (born 1951), American artist and designer
Kurt Küppers (1894–1971), German World War I fighter pilot
Martin Kupper (born 1989), Estonian discus thrower
Petra Kuppers (born 1968), German-American artist and disability culture activist
Paul Kupper (died 1908), American sculptor and creator of Eight Stone Lions
Stephan Küppers, West German slalom canoer

Places
 Nowa Kopernia, a village in Poland whose German name is Küpper

References

Germanic-language surnames